Mordechai Meirovitz (born 1930 in Romania) is an Israeli telecommunications expert. 

Meirovitz invented the code-breaking board game Master Mind. After being rejected by leading games companies, he sparked the interest of a Leicester-based company, Invicta Plastics, which restyled and renamed the game. Released in 1971, the game sold over 50 million sets in 80 countries, making it the most successful new game of the 1970s.

In Israel, the game is marketed as Bul pgi'a.

See also
 Israeli inventions and discoveries

References

Living people
1930 births
Israeli inventors
Board game designers
Israeli civil servants
Postmasters